Amphidromus syndromoideus is a species of air-breathing land snail, a terrestrial pulmonate gastropod mollusc in the family Camaenidae.

Distribution
Distribution of Amphidromus syndromoideus include Khammouan Province in Laos.

Description

References

External links 

syndromoideus
Gastropods described in 2017